Kelly McLane (born 1968) is an American artist. Known for her paintings, Mclane also works in sculpture and drawing. 

McLane received an MFA degree from UC Davis in 1994. She lives and works in Havilah, California.

Her work is included in the collections of the Whitney Museum of American Art, the Museum of Modern Art, New York, the National Gallery of Art, Washington and the Los Angeles County Museum of Art.

References

1968 births
Living people
University of California, Davis alumni
20th-century American painters
21st-century American painters
20th-century American women artists
21st-century American women artists